The Davson Baronetcy, of Berbice in British Guiana, is a title in the Baronetage of the United Kingdom. It was created on 21 January 1927 for Edward Rae Davson. He was Chairman of the Federation of Chambers of Commerce of the British Empire and a member of the Imperial Economic Committee and the Colonial Development Advisory Committee. Davson married Margot Elinor, daughter of Clayton Louis Glyn and his wife, the novelist Elinor Glyn. He was succeeded by his eldest son, the second Baronet. Like his maternal grandmother he was an author. In 1957 he assumed by deed poll the surname of Glyn in lieu of his patronymic as well as the additional forename of Anthony. As of 2014 the title is held by the latter's nephew, the fourth Baronet, who succeeded his father in 2004.

As of 31 January 2014, the present Baronet had not successfully proved his succession and was therefore not on the Official Roll of the Baronetage, with the baronetcy considered dormant since 2004. In 2016 the present Baronet, Sir George Davson, was able to prove his succession, and therefore the baronetcy is no longer dormant.

Davson baronets, of Berbice (1927)
Sir Edward Davson, 1st Baronet (1875–1937)
Sir Anthony Geoffrey Ian Simon Glyn, 2nd Baronet (1922–1998)
Sir Christopher Davson, 3rd Baronet (1927–2004)
Sir George Davson, 4th Baronet (born 1964)

The heir apparent is the present holder's son James Davson (born 1990).

Notes

References
Kidd, Charles, Williamson, David (editors). Debrett's Peerage and Baronetage (1990 edition). New York: St Martin's Press, 1990.

Davson